The Canadian Women's Press Club (CWPC) was founded in 1904 after Margaret Graham convinced a railway publicity agent to transport sixteen women journalists to the Louisiana Purchase Exposition in St. Louis, Missouri, and the agent subsequently suggested they form their own press club.  It was renamed in 1971 as the Media Club of Canada, and unincorporated in the early 2000s.

History
In June 1904, journalist and feminist Margaret Graham of Ottawa went to see Col. George Ham, the publicity agent for the Canadian Pacific Railway. Graham reportedly asked him directly, "Can you tell my why your road has taken men to all the excursions and Fairs and other things and has ignobly ignored us, the weaker sex?". Ham promised that if Graham could find twelve professional women journalists, he would send them to St. Louis.

Margaret Graham found sixteen qualified women and they traveled in style daily to St. Louis by private railway car, with stops in Detroit and Chicago so they could file stories about their visits. On their return to Toronto ten days later, the women discussed their professional exclusion from male journalists' gatherings and press clubs. Col. Ham, who traveled with them and was smoking his pipe nearby, quietly suggested they form their own press club, which they promptly did.

Kit Coleman, a popular columnist and foreign correspondent (who had covered the war in Cuba), was chosen as the first president. The C W P C held its first convention in 1907. Col. Ham was made an honorary member. Until 1971, he was the only male member of CWPC. When Ham died in 1926 after 35 years as publicity agent for CPR, CWPC dedicated a plaque in his honour on the wall of Montreal's Windsor Station.

CWPC grew rapidly and over the years notable members included Nellie McClung, Cora Hind, Lucy Maud Montgomery, Emmeline Pankhurst, Emily Murphy, Byrne Hope Sanders, Marshall Saunders, Miriam Green Ellis, Doris Anderson, and Charlotte Whitton. By its Golden Jubilee in 1954, the club had over 500 members with branches from Victoria to Halifax. In 1971, at a general meeting in Toronto, it was decided to change the club's name to Media Club of Canada, which made the name readily translatable into French, and opened the doors to male members. The club celebrated its 90th birthday in Halifax in 1994. The need for networking among young women journalists was no longer as great, however, and the club declined until it was finally unincorporated during their Centennial celebrations in 2004. The Ottawa Media Club continues with a small membership.

Founding members

 Kathleen Blake Coleman of the Mail and Empire, Toronto
 "Francoise" Barry of La Journal de Francoise, Montreal
 Kate Simpson Hayes, 'Mary Markwell" of the Free Press, Winnipeg
 Mary Adelaide Dawson of the Telegram, Toronto
 Irene Currie Love, of the Advertiser, London, Ontario
 Katherine Hughes, of the Bulletin, Edmonton
 Alice Asselin of La Nationalist, Montreal
 Margaret Graham of the Press, Ottawa
 A. Madeleine Gleason of La Patrie, Montreal
 Marie Beaupre of  La Press, Montreal
 Grace E. Dension of Saturday Night
 "Peggy" Balmer Watt of the Sentinel Review, Woodstock
 A. (Amintha) Plouffe of Le Journal, Montreal

References

 Shirley Muir and Penni Mitchell, "Winnipeg Women Journalists Have Always Led the Way," "Manitoba History" (2012) 70#1 pp. 47–48.
 Newspacket, publication of Canadian Women's Press Club, Golden Jubilee Issue, 1954
 Early Canadian Life, May, 1979 – "Kit Coleman – a gusty female – pioneer journalist" and "Media Club celebrates 75 years of news women" both by Dorothy Turcotte
 Content, May 1978 – "Kit Watkins: the journalist who opened the way for Canadian newspaper women"
 Rex, Kay. No daughter of Mine: The Women and History of CWPC 1904–1971. University of Toronto Press, 1995

Canadian journalism organizations
Women's organizations based in Canada
1904 establishments in Canada